DAHS may refer to:
 Dallastown Area High School, Dallastown, Pennsylvania, United States
 Dame Alice Harpur School, Bedford, England
 Division Avenue High School, Levittown, New York, United States

See also 
 Dah (disambiguation)